Sonny John Moore (born January 15, 1988), known professionally as Skrillex, is an American DJ and record producer. Growing up in Northeast Los Angeles and Northern California, he joined the post-hardcore band From First to Last as the lead singer in 2004, and recorded two studio albums with the band (Dear Diary, My Teen Angst Has a Bodycount [2004] and Heroine [2006]) before leaving to pursue a solo career in 2007. He began his first tour as a solo artist in late 2007. After recruiting a new band lineup, Moore joined the Alternative Press Tour to support bands such as All Time Low and the Rocket Summer, and appeared on the cover of Alternative Press' annual "100 Bands You Need to Know" issue.

After releasing the Gypsyhook EP in 2009, Moore was scheduled to record his debut studio album, Bells, with producer Noah Shain. He ceased production of the album, however, and began performing under the name Skrillex, distributing the dubstep EP My Name Is Skrillex for free download on his official MySpace page. Subsequently, he released the Scary Monsters and Nice Sprites EP in late 2010 and More Monsters and Sprites EP in mid-2011, both of which have since become moderate commercial successes. On November 30, 2011, he received five Grammy Award nominations at the 54th Grammy Awards, including Best New Artist and won three: "Best Dance/Electronica Album", "Best Dance Recording", and "Best Remixed Recording, Non-Classical". In December 2011, the BBC announced that he had been nominated for their Sound of 2012 poll. The same month, he was also named MTV's Electronic Dance Music Artist of the Year. Skrillex released his first studio album Recess in 2014. His second and third albums, Quest for Fire and Don't Get Too Close, were released one day apart in 2023.

Skrillex has won eight Grammy Awards, more than any other electronic dance music artist. Skrillex has collaborated with Diplo and Boys Noize to form the groups Jack Ü and Dog Blood respectively. It was announced on Moore's 29th birthday, that he reunited with From First to Last and released a single named "Make War". In 2017, Skrillex produced and mixed 8, the eighth studio album by rock band Incubus. In July 2017, Skrillex released another single featuring debuting solo artist Poo Bear.

Early life
Moore lived in the Highland Park neighborhood of Northeast Los Angeles, but was brought to the Forest Hill neighborhood of San Francisco at the age of 2, where he attended elementary school. At the ages of 9 and 10, Moore attended a boarding school in the Mojave Desert LV, but eventually moved back to Northern California. Both of his parents were Scientologists. He was adopted at birth by family friends of his biological parents and did not find this out until he was 15. By the time he was 12, his family moved back to his birthplace of Northeast Los Angeles. There he enrolled in a private academy school specializing in arts, the school used some of L. Ron Hubbard's teachings. Later, he was home schooled at the age of 14 due to bullying. In 2004, he learned he was adopted and dropped out of the program when he was 16. While a young teenager in Los Angeles, Moore would attend punk gigs in Mexican American neighborhoods in East and South Los Angeles, and later at electro club raves in the downtown's Silver Lake and Echo Park neighborhoods.

Career

2004–2007: From First to Last
In 2004, Moore contacted Matt Good of From First to Last about playing guitar for the band on their debut album. After flying out to Georgia, Moore was heard singing by three studio producers, Derrick Thomas, Eric Dale, and McHale Butler, and was then made lead singer, with Good playing guitar. In June 2004, Epitaph Records released the band's first full-length record with their new bandmate, Dear Diary, My Teen Angst Has a Body Count. After performing on several successful tours, two being the Vans Warped Tour and Dead by Dawn tour, they began recording their second album, Heroine with producer Ross Robinson. The album was released in March 2006 on Epitaph. With high record sales once again, the band found themselves part of many successful tours, until Moore started suffering vocal problems, causing the band to resign from several tours. After going through a successful vocal surgical procedure, Moore informed the band he would be permanently resigning to work on a solo career. FFTL's last show performed with Moore was in their hometown of Orlando at The House of Blues while touring with Atreyu.

Moore announced he had left From First to Last to pursue a solo career. He then launched a Myspace page displaying three demos ("Signal", "Equinox", and "Glow Worm"). This led to Moore's first performance since his leaving From First to Last. On April 7, 2007, alongside harpist Carol Robbins, Moore played several original songs at a local art building. After months of releasing demos via Myspace, Moore played on the Team Sleep Tour with a full band. The tour also featured supporting acts Monster in the Machine and Strata. Moore made several demo CDs available on this tour, limited to about 30 per show. These CDs were tour exclusive and were packaged in "baby blue envelopes", each with a unique drawing by Moore or bandmate.

2008–2013: Solo career and extended plays

In February 2008, Alternative Press Magazine announced the second annual AP Tour, with All Time Low, The Rocket Summer, The Matches, and Forever the Sickest Kids, as well as Sonny Moore. The tour started in Houston, Texas on March 14 and went through North America, ending in Cleveland, Ohio on May 2, with the majority of the shows being sold out. All bands playing the tour would be featured on the cover of Alternative Press Magazines annual 100 Bands You Need to Know special, and would be interviewed on the Alternative Press Podcast. During this tour, Moore's line-up consisted of Sean Friday on drums, Christopher Null on guitar, and Aaron Rothe on keyboards. On April 7, 2009, he released Gypsyhook, a digital EP, which featured three songs and four remixes. Also included was "海水" ("Kaisui"), a Japanese version of "Mora". Physical copies of the EP were available at his shows. After going on tour with Innerpartysystem and Paper Route and opening for Chiodos on their European tour, Moore performed at Bamboozle on May 2. He performed on Bamboozle Left's Saints and Sinners stage on April 4. He toured with Hollywood Undead in April 2009 performing under the band name Sonny and the Blood Monkeys, with Chris Null (electric guitar), Sean Friday (drums, percussion, and beats) and Aaron Rothe (keyboards, synthesizers, programming, and turntables). Moore has stated that the album Bells will not be released.

In 2008, Moore began producing and performing under the alias Skrillex at clubs in the Los Angeles area. The name, according to Moore, has no meaning and was "a stupid old online AOL screen name". Previously, he had been known on the Internet as Twipz. On June 7, 2010, Moore released his official Skrillex debut EP, My Name Is Skrillex as a free download. Moore provided programming and vocals for UK metalcore band Bring Me the Horizon on their third studio album, There Is a Hell Believe Me I've Seen It. There Is a Heaven Let's Keep It a Secret. Later in the year, Sonny began a nationwide tour with deadmau5 after being signed to mau5trap recordings and released his second EP, Scary Monsters and Nice Sprites.

Moore kicked off the "Project Blue Book Tour" in 2011 with support from Porter Robinson, Tommy Lee and DJ Aero as well as appearances from Sofia Toufa for a new song, "Bring Out the Devil". Skrillex unveiled several new songs on this tour including "First of the Year" (formerly known as "Equinox"), "Reptile", and "Cinema" (remix of a Benny Benassi track). "Reptile" was featured in the TV commercial for Mortal Kombat 9, and "First of the Year (Equinox)" is featured on More Monsters and Sprites, his follow-up EP and remix companion to Scary Monsters and Nice Sprites. In April 2011, Spin premiered "Get Up", an exclusive new track from Korn that was produced by Skrillex. Korn made the track available for free download via their Facebook page. On April 15, 2011, KoRn joined Skrillex on stage for his set at Coachella 2011. On April 18, 2011, Sony Computer Entertainment (SCEA) development studio Naughty Dog released a trailer for the multiplayer component of their PlayStation 3 game Uncharted 3: Drake's Deception, featuring "Kill EVERYBODY" from Scary Monsters and Nice Sprites.

In June 2011, "More Monsters and Sprites" was released on Beatport, an EP consisting of three original tracks, including "First of the Year (Equinox)" and two versions of his original track "Ruffneck". The track "Ruffneck Bass" had been leaked on the internet months prior which used the same sample as in the new "Ruffneck" tracks on the EP. Skrillex released a music video for "Rock n' Roll (Will Take You to the Mountain)" on his official YouTube page on June 20, 2011. On August 17, 2011, he announced his label, Owsla. The label's first releases came from Bristol-based dubstep producers KOAN Sound, then-electro-house producer Porter Robinson from North Carolina, singer-songwriter Alvin Risk, and San Francisco-based M Machine. 

On August 19, 2011, Skrillex released a music video for "First of the Year (Equinox)" via Spin.com. In late August 2011, it was released that he would be appearing Knife Party's first release, collaborating on "Zoology", a Moombahton style track. A preview was released on YouTube. In late September 2011, he created the track "Syndicate" as promotion for the video game of the same name. Kaskade's 2011 album Fire & Ice features "Lick It", a collaboration between Kaskade and Skrillex. The video for Skrillex's song "First of the Year (Equinox)" appears on the first episode of the Beavis and Butt-head revival.

On November 8, Skrillex stated that he intended to release an album, Voltage. Skrillex gave fans more info about Voltage in RockSound Magazine after a photoshoot for the cover and doing an extensive interview on his tour. For unknown reasons, however, the album was never released, however on December 21, 2011, Skrillex unveiled the Bangarang EP for a Beatport release on December 23, then on August 12, 2012, his new side-project formed with Boys Noize called Dog Blood released an EP called Next Order/Middle Finger. On November 6, 2012, Skrillex released a limited edition triple vinyl box set. Skrillex composed the song "Bug Hunt" for the 2012 animated film Wreck-It Ralph, as well as making a brief cameo as a DJ in the film's first act, and in December 2012, "Make It Bun Dem" is used in as a looped variant during the single-player mission 'Kick the Hornets Nest' in the video game Far Cry 3. He composed the score for Spring Breakers with Cliff Martinez.

In 2012, Skrillex formed Dog Blood with Boys Noize. Their debut single, consisting of the songs "Next Order" and "Middle Finger", was released on August 12, 2012, on Beatport and iTunes. The song "Next Order" managed to top Beatport's Techno chart. 

In 2013, Skrillex formed a duo with Diplo called Jack Ü. Jack Ü's debut performance took place at the Mad Decent Block Party in San Diego on September 15, 2013, which is a nationwide tour that record label Mad Decent puts together to showcase different artists signed to the label. Diplo announced the project by releasing the Mad Decent Block Party lineup with Jack Ü playing at multiple stops on the tour. After some guessing by many of who Jack Ü was, Diplo finally came out to reveal that "Jack Ü ... means Skrillex and Diplo together".

2014: Recess
Skrillex confirmed at a show in January 2013 that he would release a new LP in the summer. On January 2, 2013, Skrillex released his 7th EP, Leaving, on the OWSLA subscription service, Nest IV. He later released the single "Try It Out" with Alvin Risk.

On March 7, 2014, an App titled "Alien Ride" was put up on Apple's App Store which contained a secret folder with 11 hidden objects and a countdown ending March 10 at 6:30 EST. Moore's website was updated with the App's picture on the front page and it was later revealed the folder contains Google Play and iTunes url's which eventually were revealed to be 11 new songs available to stream that comprised his debut LP, titled Recess. The album was made available for pre-order at midnight and was released on March 18, 2014.

2016–2022: Collaborations and return to From First to Last

In 2016 Skrillex collaborated with the K-pop girl group 4Minute. The first track, "Hate", was composed and arranged by Skrillex.

On January 15, 2017, Moore tweeted "Happy Birthday" with a link to a new From First to Last song which featured Moore on vocals. He later joined the band in Emo Nite LA for the first time in nearly a decade. In 2017, he released the songs "Chicken Soup" with Habstrakt, "Would You Ever" with Poo Bear, "Saint Laurent" with DJ Sliink and Wale and "Favor" with Vindata and NSTASIA.

In July 2018, Skrillex teased fans by collaborating with Missy Elliott on a snippet nicknamed "ID", a release date for the single has yet to be announced.

On October 8, 2018, Skrillex uploaded a photo to Twitter showcasing a collaboration between him and English DJ and producer Joyryde, later posting a video teaser of the song to Instagram. The collaboration, "Agen Wida", was officially released on October 19, 2018. On October 25, 2018, Skrillex released the single "Arms Around You", a collaboration featuring XXXTentacion, Lil Pump, Maluma and Swae Lee.

Skrillex, Poo Bear, and Japanese-American singer Hikaru Utada collaborated on "Face My Fears", an opening song for the video game Kingdom Hearts III. The single was released on January 18, 2019.

On July 18, 2019, Skrillex released a two-track EP, Show Tracks, consisting of "Fuji Opener" featuring Alvin Risk and "Mumbai Power" featuring rapper Beam. Later that year, Skrillex made an appearance at The Warehouse Project in Manchester alongside Four Tet and Jon Hopkins.

On October 27, 2021, Skrillex performed his first solo set in the U.S. since the beginning of the pandemic at Avant Gardner in Brooklyn, New York.

Throughout 2021 and 2022, Skrillex released various singles including "Butterflies", "In da Getto" and "Don't Go".

2023: Quest For Fire and Don't Get Too Close 
In January 2023, Moore posted a short video to social media teasing the release of his long-anticipated follow-up to his 2014 album, Recess. He subsequently announced that the lead single "Rumble", featuring Flowdan and Fred Again would be released on January 4.

On February 13, 2023, Skrillex released the single "Don't Get Too Close". He is separately credited as "Sonny Moore" on the title track of his second 2023 album, and is featured as a vocalist for the first time since 2015's Skrillex and Diplo Present Jack Ü.

On February 17, 2023, Skrillex released his second album, Quest For Fire, featuring a mix of pre-released singles and new songs, containing a range of genres with artists such as Flowdan, Porter Robinson and Fred Again credited. Critical reception was generally positive, with Ben Jolley for NME writing that "[Skrillex's] return largely lives up to the hype" by "often channel[ing] nostalgia", yet also commenting that "the album lacks a clear narrative or overarching theme".

On February 18, 2023, while performing at a sold out Madison Square Garden venue with Four Tet and Fred Again, Skrillex released his third studio album, Don't Get Too Close, less than two days after the release of Quest For Fire.

Influences
Moore has cited Marilyn Manson, Nine Inch Nails and the Doors as early influences. Moore stated in an online interview that he is a longtime fan of Warp, a label whose roster includes notable electronic artists such as Aphex Twin and Squarepusher. In an interview for Daft Punk Unchained, a 2015 documentary about the French electronic music duo Daft Punk, Moore said he was first exposed to electronic dance music after attending the duo's highly praised 2006 Coachella set.

Personal life
Moore dated English singer-songwriter Ellie Goulding throughout 2012. In a 2015 interview, Moore stated that although his parents practiced Scientology, he does not. He explained that music consumes most of the time he could theoretically devote to religion. His mother died in June 2015.

In a series of tweets in January 2023, Skrillex shared his struggles with mental health, revealing the reason behind the cancellation of his appearances at Movement Detroit and Tampa's Sunset Music Festival. "[I have] had the toughest year of my life in 2022, as did so many others. I literally found myself with no drive and purpose for the first time in my life". He noted that his mother's passing in 2015 saw him turn to alcohol; "I drank the pain away and kept going", "2022 was sort of my tipping point".

Discography

Studio albums
 Recess (2014)
 Quest for Fire (2023)
 Don't Get Too Close (2023)

Filmography
 Let's Make a Spaceship (2014)
Moore partnered up with Red Bull to produce a documentary titled "Let's Make a Spaceship". It premiered on October 11, 2014, at 10 p.m. CT at the ACL Festival after his headline performance. His performance and documentary, and others' performances are available for stream at Red Bull TV's website.

Awards and nominations

Listicles

See also
 List of Billboard Social 50 number-one artists

References

External links

 
 Skrillex on Discogs

1988 births
Living people
21st-century American singers
Ableton Live users
American adoptees
American DJs
American electronic musicians
American house musicians
Annie Award winners
Atlantic Records artists
Big Beat Records (American record label) artists
Dubstep musicians
Electro house musicians
Electronic dance music DJs
From First to Last members
Grammy Award winners for dance and electronic music
Mau5trap artists
Moombahcore musicians
Owsla artists
Post-hardcore musicians
Singers from Los Angeles
Songwriters from California
Trap musicians (EDM)